Eugene Concert Choir is a choral masterworks organization in Eugene, Oregon, that consists of three performing ensembles: the 100-voice Eugene Concert Choir (ECC), the 36-voice chamber choir Eugene Vocal Arts (EVA), and the associated professional chamber orchestra Eugene Concert Orchestra.

Description 
Described from its beginnings in the 1980s by the Eugene Register Guard as "Community enterprise at its best," the organization is a resident company of the Hult Center for the Performing Arts, which is the primary performance venue for the choirs. Eugene Vocal Arts also regularly performs at The University of Oregon's Beall Concert Hall.  Community and educational outreach is an important element in the organization and the Eugene Concert Choir Outreach program annually reaches 1,000+ children through in-school presentations. Diane Retallack has been the artistic director and Conductor since 1985.

The Eugene Concert Choir organization is a 501(c)(3) non-profit organization governed by a board of directors, and its mission is "to engage, inspire and enrich the community through performance of choral masterworks, diverse artistic experiences, and educational outreach." Touring choirs from the organization have performed in Australia, China, Europe, and Carnegie Hall in New York City.

The Eugene Concert Choir commissioned a choral masterwork entitled Shadow and Light: An Alzheimer's Journey in 16 Movements by Portland composer Joan Szymko. The premiere performances were April 6 and 8, 2016 by the Eugene Vocal Arts and the newly formed Eugene Concert Orchestra, three soloists and speaker. The recording of Shadow and Light was awarded the American Prize Ernst Bacon Award for Recorded Music, Community Division, in 2016. The video documentary by AO Films entitled The Story of Shadow and Light: Giving Voice to an Alzheimer's Journey won Best Documentary in the 2017 Oregon Independent Film Festival.

Repertoire

Eugene Concert Choir
The Eugene Concert Choir is a mixed-voice adult volunteer chorus which focuses on performing choral masterworks. Highlights of past masterworks performances include:
Ludwig van Beethoven: Missa Solemnis, Op.; Mass in C, Op. 
Hector Berlioz: Requiem, Op. 
Johannes Brahms: Ein Deutsches Requiem, Op. ; Schicksalslied, Op. 
Benjamin Britten: War Requiem, Op. 
Anton Bruckner: E Minor Mass, Op. 
Antonio Estévez: Cantata Criolla
Gabriel Fauré: Requiem, Op. 
Charles Gounod: St. Cecilia Mass, Op. 
G. F. Handel: Messiah, Op. ; Dettingen Te Deum, Op. 
Franz Joseph Haydn: The Creation, Lord Nelson Mass, Mass in Time of War
Zoltan Kodaly: Te Deum, Op. 
Kuljeric: Missa, Op. 
Felix Mendelssohn: Die erste Walpurgisnacht, Op.(In collaboration with the Eugene Ballet)
W. A. Mozart: Requiem, Op. ; Grand Mass in C Minor, Op. ; Vespers, Op. (date); Coronation Mass, Op.
Carl Orff: Carmina Burana, Op.(In collaboration with the Eugene Ballet)
Giacomo Puccini: Messa di Gloria, Op.
Ariel Ramirez: Misa Criolla
Igor Stravinsky: A Symphony of Psalms, Op., Les Noces, Op. (In collaboration with the Eugene Ballet)
Ralph Vaughan Williams: Dona Nobis Pacem, Op.

The Eugene Concert Choir has performed numerous smaller works and excerpts of major works, and the complete opera, Amahl and the Night Visitors by Gian Carlo Menotti (date).

The Eugene Concert Choir also lightens the concert season by presenting more popular fare. Past performances have included shows titled American Style, The Big Bands Era, Hot Latin Nights, The British Invasion, The Best of Broadway, and Jazz, Gospel & Motown. These popular presentations were original musical revues created by Artistic Director Diane Retallack. The first of these popular creations was 20th Century America in Revue, inspired by a review of music in America for the millennium celebration in the year 2000. The most ambitious original creation was a fully staged musical, A Dickens of a Christmas, based on Charles Dickens’ A Christmas Carol, performed at the Hult Center in 2015 and reprised in December 2018. Diane Retallack joined with DJ Prashant Kakad for the collaborative creation of an original musical titled A Bollywood Dream, performed by the Eugene Concert Choir and Prashant Kakad’s organization Bollywood Dreams in April of 2018.

Eugene Vocal Arts
Eugene Vocal Arts performs works appropriate for a select chamber choir, from the Renaissance to the present. Recent repertoire has included an element of social significance. Eugene Vocal Arts performed the world premiere of the commissioned work Shadow and Light; An Alzheimer’s Journey in 16 Movements by Oregon composer Joan Szymko in April of 2016. Their spring concert in 2019, The Peace of Wild Things, focused on contemporary choral music to heighten awareness of our precious natural world and reflect on what “Earth Day” means to us and to future generations. The 2019–2020 season will include The Unarmed Child, composer Michael Bussewitz-Quarm's response to gun violence against children, and a concert titled In Celebration of Women, to mark the 100th anniversary of women's right to vote.

From 1990 to 1999, the Eugene Vocal Arts ensemble presented English Madrigal Dinners in elaborate Elizabethan attire. They revived the English Madrigal Dinner in date --, later moving the event to the spring for a MayFest dinner for two years. The Ensemble continues to perform Renaissance repertoire in authentic Elizabethan dress in concert presentations.

Works performed with orchestra include:
C. P. E. Bach: Magnificat
J. S. Bach: Lobet den Herrn
G. F. Handel: Dettingen te Deum; Dixit Dominus
F. J. Haydn: St. Cecilia; Lord Nelson Mass
Franz Schubert: Mass in A-flat
Joan Szymko: Shadow and Light
Antonio Vivaldi: Gloria; Magnificat

Eugene Concert Orchestra 
The Eugene Concert Orchestra, the professional orchestra of the Eugene Concert Choir organization, has primarily assisted the Eugene Vocal Arts and the Eugene Concert Choir in the choral-orchestral works performed with the organization from its debut concert in fall of 2015 with the Haydn St. Cecilia Mass. Occasionally the orchestra is featured in orchestral repertoire alone and has performed the Albinoni Adagio and Pachelbel's Canon.

History 
The Eugene Concert Choir was founded as the Eugene Community Chorus under the direction of Philip Bayles, who brought the singers together for a read-through of Handel's Messiah in April 1974. The singers organized themselves into a continuing ensemble, elected officers, and continued to perform with Philip Bayles as their director and conductor through the 1981–82 season. Paul Westlund was hired as artistic director for the 1982–83 season, and Peter Jermihov became director for the following two seasons.

Diane Retallack was hired as artistic director and Conductor at the start of the 1985–86 season and has continued in that position to the present. In 1986, she founded the Eugene Vocal Arts Ensemble (frequently referred to as simply Eugene Vocal Arts) as a chamber choir within the Eugene Concert Choir organization. At the start of Retallack's tenure, the Eugene Concert Choir hired the Oregon Mozart Players to be their partner orchestra for most of their concerts, occasionally hiring the Eugene Symphony Orchestra for larger works.

The Eugene Concert Orchestra was formed in 2015 as a part of the Eugene Concert Choir organization in response to the needs for the Shadow and Light recording project, and has continued as the orchestra of the organization, performing with both choirs.

Personnel 
 Artistic and executive director: Diane Retallack
 General manager: Angela Egremont
 Marketing and public relations director: Elizabeth Wells
 Music education director: Jill Switzer
 Orchestra and personnel manager: Colleen White
 Payroll and reconciliation: Chris Vold

The organization is also served by a board of directors and many volunteers.

Discography 
 Holiday Joy, a collection of Christmas songs, as well as excerpts from Handel's Messiah
 American Spirit, an exploration of the wide variety of musical styles of 20th-century composers and arrangers from North America
 A Celtic Christmas, featuring Benjamin Britten's A Ceremony of Carols along with Celtic Christmas songs performed with the Willis Clan
 Shadow and Light, a masterwork commissioned by the Eugene Concert Choir, composed by Joan Szymko and performed by Eugene Vocal Arts and Eugene Concert Orchestra. This work gives voice to the challenges, courage and loving acceptance of people affected by Alzheimer's and other forms of dementia. The DVD/CD set includes the concert and video documentary DVD as well as the audio recording CD of Shadow and Light.

Notes

External links 
Eugene Concert Choir (Official Website)
2019 American Style Review(Register Guard)
2019 Fauré Requiem Review (Register Guard)
2018 A Dickens of A Christmas Preview (Register Guard)
2018 Schubert Mass in A-flat Review (Register Guard)
2018 A Bollywood Dream Review (Register Guard)
2020 Concert Music Scene in Eugne (City Club)

Choirs in Oregon
Musical groups from Eugene, Oregon
Non-profit organizations based in Oregon
1975 establishments in Oregon
Musical groups established in 1975